Sin Gwang-su (also known as Shin Kwang-soo, born 1 March 1965) is a South Korean former sailor. He competed in the men's 470 event at the 1988 Summer Olympics.

References

External links
 
 

1965 births
Living people
South Korean male sailors (sport)
Olympic sailors of South Korea
Sailors at the 1988 Summer Olympics – 470
Place of birth missing (living people)